Robert Newton (1905–1956) was an English stage and film actor.

Robert Newton may also refer to:

 Robert Newton (hurdler) (born 1981), British hurdler
 Robert C. Newton (1840–1877), lawyer and Confederate General in Arkansas during the American Civil War
 Robert Russell Newton (1918–1991), American physicist, astronomer and historian of science
 Robert E. Newton (born 1931), American politician in the state of Iowa
 Robert Newton (academic) (1889–1985), Canadian scientist and academic administrator
 Bob Newton (American football) (born 1949), former American football guard
 Bob Newton (footballer, born 1946), English footballer
 Bob Newton (footballer, born 1956), English footballer
 Rob Newton (footballer) (born 1953), Australian footballer who played for Essendon
 Rob Newton (cricketer) (born 1990), English cricket player
 Bob Newton, character in Alias John Preston

See also